Bhajantrilu is a 2007 Indian Telugu film, directed by the renowned comedian M. S. Narayana and starring Sivaji, Vikram, Sushmita and Sivani. The film was released on 1 November 2007. It was not very successful.

Plot

The story is about two brothers.

Cast

Sivaji
Vikram (M. S. Narayana's son)
Sushmita
Sivani
Kota Srinivasa Rao
Brahmanandam
Ali
Sunil
Venu Madhav
M. S. Narayana
Krishna Bhagavaan
Kondavalasa Lakshmana Rao
AVS
L.B. Sriram
Geetha Singh
Gundu Sudarshan
Mumaith Khan

Production 
This is M. S. Narayana's second film with his son Vikram after Koduku (2004).

References

External links
Movie launch
Opening announcement
Audio
Release announcement
2000s Telugu-language films